MTV Roadies X1 : Ride for Respect is the eleventh season of Indian reality show MTV Roadies. The show was hosted by Rannvijay Singh, who was also one of the judges, along with Raghu Ram, during personal interview rounds. It started airing on MTV India from 25 January 2014.

The series was won by Nikhil Sachdeva (also popularly known as Nick). He won the title on 18 May 2014. His grand price included a Hero Impulse bike and a total cash price of  320,000.

Destination

Roadies' selection

Overall Count:

Contestants
There are fourteen contestants selected from 4 cities.

The Journey

Episode 1 - JodhpurPairing Task Results:

Episode 2 - Jodhpur
 Results:

 Sent to the elimination challenge: Siddharth & Meher and Rishie & Nikhat
 Eliminated: Rishie & Nikhat

Episode 3 - Jodhpur ➔ JaisalmerMoney Task Results:

 Results:

Episode 4 - Jaisalmer
 Results:

 Sent to the elimination challenge: Rajkumar & Meher and Nikhil & Rashika
 Eliminated: Rajkumar & Meher

Episode 5 - Jaisalmer ➔ BarmerMoney Task Results:

Episode 6 - BarmerPairing Task Results:

 Sent to the elimination challenge: Siddharth & Pallavi and Nikhil & Charu
 Eliminated: Siddharth & Pallavi

Episode 7 - Barmer ➔ Rajasthan
Eliminated roadies returnWild card Task - quiz Results:

Episode 8 - Mehsana , GujaratWild card Task Results:Immunity Task Results:

 Sent to the elimination challenge: Siddharth & Charu and Nikhil & Rashika
 Eliminated:' Siddharth & Charu

Elimination chartThe colors are used to denote the pairs. They are not necessarily associated to a certain pair.''

  Made immune to elimination on the basis of performance in immunity task.
  Sent directly to 'Walk The Talk' challenge on the basis of performance in immunity task.
  Nominated to battle opponent(s) in 'Walk The Talk' challenge where the loser is ousted from the show.
  Directly eliminated as a consequence of losing a task.

 Out of the seven chosen girls from the auditions and one from battleground the boys had to choose a partner to make a pair. With seven girls being chosen out of eight Anjali being left out was eliminated and newcomer Pallavi secured a spot in the competition.
 Pairings were revised in Episode 4, 7 and 9.

References

External links 

MTV Roadies
2014 Indian television seasons